Christopher Lloyd (1678-1757) was an Irish Anglican priest in the mid 18th-century.

LLoyd was born in County Kilkenny and educated at Trinity College, Dublin.  He was Dean of Elphin from 1739 until his death.

He is buried at St. Bride's Church, Dublin.

References 

1678 births
Deans of Elphin
1757 deaths
18th-century Irish Anglican priests
Alumni of Trinity College Dublin
People from County Kilkenny